Juan Pablo Varillas Patiño-Samudio (born 6 October 1995) is a Peruvian tennis player.

Varillas has a career-high ATP singles ranking of No. 76 achieved on 6 March 2023. He is currently the No. 1 Peruvian tennis player. Varillas has won 5 ATP Challenger and 5 ITF singles titles. He also has a career-high ATP doubles ranking of No. 289 achieved on 10 May 2021. Varillas has won 4 ITF doubles titles. 
He has represented Peru at the Davis Cup where he has a total W/L record of 13–12. In singles his W/L is 11–8.

Career

2020-21: ATP & Olympics debut
Varillas made his ATP debut at the 2020 Chile Open as a lucky loser where he reached the second round by defeating Filip Horansky before losing to Albert Ramos-Vinolas.
The following year at the same tournament he reached the quarterfinals as a qualifier where he lost to top seed and eventual winner Christian Garin.
Varillas qualified to represent Peru at the  Summer Olympics.

2022: Grand Slam & top 100 debut
At the 2022 French Open he qualified to make his Grand Slam main draw debut but lost to ninth seed Felix Auger-Aliassime.

He reached the quarterfinals at the 2022 Swiss Open Gstaad as a qualifier defeating top-20 player and third seed Roberto Bautista Agut before losing to Dominic Thiem.

He also reached the round of 16 at the 2022 Generali Open Kitzbühel where he lost to fifth seed Albert Ramos-Viñolas. As a result he made his debut in the top 100, as one of the five Peruvian men to achieve the feat, at a new career-high of world No. 97 on 1 August 2022.

2023: Australian Open debut, First ATP semifinal & top 80 
At the 2023 Australian Open he qualified for the first time into the main draw at this Major but lost in the first round to former top-2 player and twelfth seed Alexander Zverev.

At the 2023 Argentina Open he reached the round of 16 as a qualifier defeating João Sousa. Next he defeated former top-3 player wildcard Dominic Thiem to move into the quarterfinals. He reached his first ATP semifinal with his second win over a top-20 player and third seed Lorenzo Musetti. As a result he moved 20 positions up and reached a new career high ranking in the top 85.

Future and Challenger finals

Singles: 23 (10–13)

Doubles: 7 (4-3)

Other finals

South American Games

Doubles 1 (1 runner-up)

Record against top 10 players
Varillas's record against players who have been ranked in the top 10, with those who are active in boldface. Only ATP Tour main draw matches are considered:

Notes

References

External links

 
 
 

1995 births
Living people
Peruvian male tennis players
Sportspeople from Lima
South American Games silver medalists for Peru
South American Games bronze medalists for Peru
South American Games medalists in tennis
Competitors at the 2018 South American Games
Pan American Games medalists in tennis
Pan American Games bronze medalists for Peru
Tennis players at the 2019 Pan American Games
Medalists at the 2019 Pan American Games
Olympic tennis players of Peru
Tennis players at the 2020 Summer Olympics
21st-century Peruvian people